Bjelland is a surname that is derived from several farms in Norway. It consists of the Old Norse word bær and for a farm or farmstead and the word for land.

Notable people with the surname include:

 Anders Andersen Bjelland (1790–1850), a Norwegian politician
 Andreas Bjelland (born 1988), a Danish footballer
 Christian Bjelland (disambiguation), multiple people
 Kat Bjelland (born 1963), an American musician
 Sveinung Bjelland (born 1970), a Norwegian classical pianist

See also
 Bjelland (disambiguation)

References

Danish-language surnames
Norwegian-language surnames